The 2010 Lithuanian Swimming Championships a long course (50 m) event, organized by the Lithuanian Swimming Federation, was held in Alytus, Lithuania, from July 1–3.

Events 
The swimming program for 2010 had 38 events (19 each for men and women).  The following were contested:
Freestyle: 50 m, 100 m, 200 m, 400 m, 800 m (only women), 1500 m (only men)
Backstroke: 50 m, 100 m, 200 m
Breaststroke: 50 m, 100 m, 200 m
Butterfly: 50 m, 100 m, 200 m
Individual medley: 200 m, 400 m
Relay: 4×100 m free, 4×200 m free; 4×100 m medley

Results

Men's events

Women's events

References

Results

External links
LPF official website

2010
2010 in Lithuanian sport
2010 in swimming